The Annie Award for Best Animated Short Subject is an Annie Award given annually to the best animated short film.

History
It was introduced in 1995. In 1998, the award was renamed to Outstanding Achievement in an Animated Short Subject, and renamed again to Outstanding Individual Achievement in Animated Short Subject in 1999, but went back to its second title in 2000. In 2005, it was again reverted to its original title, and has remained so ever since.

Winners and nominees

1990s

2000s

2010s

2020s

See also
 Academy Award for Best Animated Short Film

References

External links 
 Annie Awards: Legacy

Annie Awards
Best Animated Short Subject Annie Award winners
Awards established in 1995